Acanthosis nigricans-muscle cramps-acral enlargement syndrome, also known as Acanthosis nigricans-insulin resistance-muscle cramps-acral enlargement syndrome is an extremely rare genetic disorder which is characterized by the appearance of acanthosis nigricans, insulin resistance, muscle cramps of severe intensity, and acral hypertrophy/enlargement. Only 2 cases have been reported in medical literature.

It was first discovered when Jeffrey Flier and his colleagues described two siblings of the opposite sex with the symptoms mentioned above. (plus: large, chunky hands), the sister had virilized polycystic ovaries. After being treated with dilantin, the cramps' severity lowered and the brother's insulin resistance also lowered. The inheritance pattern of this disorder is thought to be autosomal recessive.

References 

Autosomal recessive disorders